Kobryn District is an administrative subdivision, a raion of Brest Region, in Belarus. Its administrative center is Kobryn. There are 162 settlements in the district, of which one is urban and 161 are rural. Rural settlements are part of 11 selsoviets.

Demographics
According to the 2009 census, the population of the district is 88 037 people, of which 51 166 people living in Kobrin, and the remaining 36 871 in rural areas. 87.9% are of Belarusian, 6.1% Russian, 4.5% Ukrainian and 0.6% Polish ethnicity. 51.2% speak Russian and 43.1% Belarusian as their native language.

Tourist Information
Among the attractions of the area 15 archeological monuments, 26 architectural monuments, 3 historical monument, the park is named after Suvorov.

Among the monuments in the local account, there are: 
12 archeological sites; 
9 ancient tombs and boulders; 
35 monuments of the cult-building; 
9 estates; 
3 historical monument and a memorial plaque dedicated to the War of 1812; 
9 historical monuments from the First World War and the Russo-Polish War (6 military cemeteries from World War I); 
5 historical times Kobrinschiny part II of Poland; 
93 monuments of the Second World War; 
14 monuments of the famous countrymen and government leaders. Also near the village tract in Lyahchitsy Kniazha Mountain is the tomb, which is buried in the national tradition Saint Olga.

Notes

 
Districts of Brest Region